Chen Hsiao-huan (born 12 March 1987) is a Taiwanese badminton player. Born in Kaohsiung City, Chen has been playing badminton since the age of 11; she is 1.57 m tall and plays right-handed. In 2015, she won the women's singles event at the national badminton championships after beat Hu Ling-fang with the score 20–22, 21–9, 21–15.  She participated at the 2009, 2010, 2011, 2013 and 2015 World Championships.

Achievements

BWF Grand Prix 
The BWF Grand Prix had two levels, the Grand Prix and Grand Prix Gold. It was a series of badminton tournaments sanctioned by the Badminton World Federation (BWF) and played between 2007 and 2017.

Mixed doubles

  BWF Grand Prix Gold tournament
  BWF Grand Prix tournament

References

External links 
 
 

1987 births
Living people
Sportspeople from Kaohsiung
Taiwanese female badminton players
Badminton players at the 2010 Asian Games
Badminton players at the 2014 Asian Games
Badminton players at the 2018 Asian Games
Asian Games competitors for Chinese Taipei
21st-century Taiwanese women